Auxy is the name or part of the name of the following communes in France:

 Auxy, Loiret, in the Loiret department
 Auxy, Saône-et-Loire, in the Saône-et-Loire department
 Saint-Martin-d'Auxy, in the Saône-et-Loire department

It may also refer to:

Auxy: Beat Studio, a music sequencer app for the Apple iPad